Velebit is the largest, though not the highest, mountain range in Croatia. The range forms a part of the Dinaric Alps and is located along the Adriatic coast, separating it from Lika in the interior. Velebit begins in the northwest near Senj with the Vratnik mountain pass and ends 145 km to the southeast near the source of the Zrmanja river northwest of Knin.

Its highest peak is the Vaganski vrh at 1,757 m. Major mountain passes on Velebit include the aforementioned Vratnik or Senjsko bilo at 694 m.a.s.l., where the Josephina connects Senj with Josipdol; Oštarijska vrata at 928 m.a.s.l. that connects Karlobag and Gospić; and Prezid at 766 m.a.s.l. that connects Obrovac and Gračac.

Velebit is characterized by its simple, solid form, stiff cliffs, the lack of vegetation on the seaward side (towards the Velebit Channel), and the wood-covered slopes of the Lika side. The basic geological characteristic of the mountains is karst; flora and fauna are abundant. The whole mountain range is protected as a nature park. The most popular spots on Velebit are: the peak of Vučjak (1,644 m) above Zavižan, the botanical gardens and caves, Hajdučki and Rožanski kukovi, Štirovača, the Northern Velebit National Park and the Paklenica National Park. The Croatian Meteorological and Hydrological Service has a permanent measurement station at Zavižan.

Regions

Velebit is usually divided into four regions:
 the northern part between the mountain passes Vratnik and Veliki Alan, with the highest peak Mali Rajinac (1699 m)
 the middle part between Veliki Alan and Baške Oštarije with the highest peak Šatorina (1624 m)
 the southern part between Oštarije and Mali Alan (peaks Vaganski vrh – 1757, Sveto brdo – 1753,)
 the southeastern part with Crnopac as the most remarkable peak

Velebit as a whole is a nature park, from which two national parks have been carved out: Paklenica and Sjeverni Velebit (Northern Velebit)

A further category of even more careful nature preservation exists within Sjeverni Velebit, the special reservation Hajdučki i Rožanski Kukovi, under the highest nature protection available in Croatia. Officially no human activity is allowed there (except research). These are the mostly still unexplored and wild places and probably will stay that way in the future.

A pathway called Premužićeva staza (Premužić's pathway) leads through the northern and middle parts of Velebit. This pathway was built between 1930 and 1933 and it connects northern and southern Velebit. Many parts of Velebit would not be reachable without it. The Velebit mountains are transversed by the A1 through the Sveti Rok Tunnel.

Peaks and areas of Velebit

 Zavižan area – North Velebit (Mali Rajinac) (1699 m)
 Rožanski Kukovi group – North Velebit (Gromovaca (1676 m) and Vratarski Kuk (1676 m)
 Alančić, Rožanski Vrh, Seravski Vrh, North Velebit (Goli Vrh (1670 m)
 Veliki Kozjak (1629 m), North Velebit
 Šatorina (1624 m) – Mid Velebit
 Stap area – South Velebit, (Debeli Kuk) (1269 m)
 Visočica (1619 m) – South Velebit
 Bojin Kuk (1110 m) – South Velebit
 Viserujna (1632 m) and Rujno – South Velebit
 Paklenica area – South Velebit
 Vaganski vrh (1757 m) – South Velebit (highest peak of Velebit)
 Liburnija (1710 m) – South Velebit
 Sveto Brdo (1751 m) – South Velebit
 Tulove Grede (1120 m) – Southeast Velebit
 Crnopac (1404 m) – Southeast Velebit

Around 70 peaks exceed 1600 m.

The caves 

There are hundreds of "holes" on Velebit. It has the largest and deepest caves in Croatia. The three-part "Lukina jama" cave is 1392 m deep, making it one of the deepest caves in the world, and the deepest in southeast Europe, while the "Slovačka jama" is 1320 m. What makes it unique is that it is completely vertical, steepest in the world. At the bottom of the pothole is a water course or siphon with branches that are still unexplored. A kind of leech was discovered in the pothole, which has been ascertained  to represent a new species, genus and family; it has been named Erpobdella mestrovi.

List of potholes on Velebit deeper than 500 m:

Lukina Jama, 1392 m, Hajdučki Kukovi – North Velebit
Slovačka Jama, 1320 m, Rožanski Kukovi – North Velebit
Velebita, 941 m, Rožanski Kukovi – North Velebit
Meduza, 679 m, Rožanski Kukovi – North Velebit
Patkov Gušt, 553 m, Hajdučki Kukovi – North Velebit
Ledena Jama, 536 m, Lomska Duliba – North Velebit
Ponor na Bunovcu, 534 m, Bunovac – South Velebit
Jama Olimp, 531 m, Hajdučki Kukovi – North Velebit
Lubuška Jama, 521 m, Hajdučki Kukovi – North Velebit

It is also home to Degenia velebitica, an endemic and protected species of plant in the mustard family discovered in 1907 by the Hungarian botanist Árpád von Degen.

The imposing nature of the Velebit mountain has made it something of a national symbol in Croatian folklore. There is a patriotic folk song "Vila Velebita" that personifies a fairy in Velebit.

Climate

Velebit in literature 

In the Republic of Venice, Velebit was known as Montagna della Morlacca ("Mountain of the Morlach"), named after the Morlachs, an originally Romance ethnic group that eventually got assimilated into the local Croatian population.

Planine, the first Croatian novel by Petar Zoranić, was inspired by the Velebit mountain.

See also 
 List of mountains in Croatia
 Rewilding Europe
 Tentative list of World Heritage Sites in Croatia

Further reading 
Literature about the Velebit that is available includes:

 Sergej Forenbacher's Velebit and its plant world.
 Željko Poljak's Mountains of Croatia.

References

External links

 Velebit nature park 

Dinaric Alps
Mountain ranges of Croatia
Nature parks of Croatia
Lika
Landforms of Lika-Senj County
Landforms of Zadar County